Jamie Hector (born October 7, 1975) is an American actor. He is known for his portrayal of drug kingpin Marlo Stanfield on the HBO drama series The Wire and as Detective Jerry Edgar in the drama series Bosch.

Career 
Hector began acting immediately after high school when he auditioned for a community theater company. While in college he had roles on television shows such as New York Undercover, Third Watch, Law & Order, Law & Order: Special Victims Unit, and The Beat. After graduation, he enrolled in the Lee Strasberg Theatre and Film Institute in New York City.

Hector appeared in the movie Paid in Full (2002). He attributes a defining moment in his career to the short film Five Deep Breaths (2003) directed by Seith Mann. With Hector in the lead role, Five Deep Breaths was an Official Selection of the Cannes, Sundance, Tribeca, and IFP Film Festivals; it went on to accumulate 16 awards.

From 2004 to 2008, Hector played Marlo Stanfield on the HBO television drama The Wire, the young, ambitious, intelligent and extremely ruthless head of the eponymous Stanfield Organization in the Baltimore drug trade. In 2016, Rolling Stone ranked him #2 of their "40 Greatest TV Villains of All Time".

Hector starred in the film Blackout (2007) with Melvin Van Peebles and Jeffrey Wright, and was featured as recurring villain Benjamin "Knox" Washington in the third season of Heroes. Hector appeared in the film Max Payne (2008), in which he plays the role of Lincoln DeNeuf, a Haitian crime boss. Hector also appeared in the television movie Just Another Day (2009), playing the up-and-coming rapper Young Eastie, who attempts to make it at all costs. His next film was Night Catches Us (2010), with Kerry Washington and Anthony Mackie. He voiced Emile-A239 (Noble 4) in Halo: Reach.

In 2014, Hector began starring in the series Bosch as Jerry Edgar, a detective and partner to the titular character Harry Bosch, played by Titus Welliver. Hector remained a part of the series starring cast across its seven season run.

In 2017, Hector appeared on the USA drama Queen of The South as Devon Finch in six episodes of season 2.

Activism 
In 2007, Hector founded Moving Mountains, Inc., a non-profit theater based organization that provides youth with year-round classes in drama, dance, vocal, and film.

He helped in raising money for survivors of the 2010 Haiti earthquake.

Filmography

Film

Television

Video games

References

External links 

 
 HBO biography

1975 births
20th-century American male actors
21st-century American male actors
Male actors from New York City
American male film actors
American people of Haitian descent
American male television actors
American male video game actors
American male voice actors
Haitian-American male actors
Living people
People from Brooklyn